The South American Youth Championship 1979 was held in Montevideo and Paysandú, Uruguay. It also served as qualification for the 1979 FIFA World Youth Championship.

Teams

The following teams entered the tournament:

 
 
 
 
 
 
 
 
  (host)

First round

Group A

Group B

Fifth-place match

Final round

Qualification to World Youth Championship
The two best performing teams qualified directly for the 1979 FIFA World Youth Championship.

 
 

Paraguay also qualified, after winning an intercontinental play-off against Israel and Australia. Matches were played in Asunción, Paraguay.

External links
Results by RSSSF

South American Youth Championship
1979 in youth association football